Give Something Back (Give Back) is an American non-profit whose mission is to provide mentors and scholarships that help Pell Grant-eligible students go to college and graduate in four years debt free.

History 

Give Back was established by Robert Carr, a former resident of Lockport, IL. When Robert was accepted as a student at the University of Illinois, he received a $250 scholarship from the Lockport Woman's Club. The money helped offset some of the costs of college and motivated Robert. He vowed that when he was able, he would give back to the club. Forty years later—on the organization's 100th anniversary—he presented a check for $100,000 to be used for scholarships. Five students each received $5,000 a year for four years. He continued this program for five years, helping 25 students earn a college education.

Funding the scholars through the Lockport Woman's Club proved to Bob that students with drive can succeed in college with the help of existing financial assistance programs.

Fuelled by the ever-growing student debt problem and studies that suggest family wealth is the greatest predictor of a child's likelihood of graduating from college, Bob founded the Give Something Back Foundation, a 501(c)(3) non-profit corporation.

Approach and success 

Give Back's results prove the program works:
 100% of our scholars graduate from high school 
 90% of our scholars graduate from college within four years 
 100% of our scholars who earned college degrees are employed 
 Over 50% of Give Back alums serve as mentors

Scope
Give Back operates in Illinois, Kansas, New Jersey, Delaware, New York, California and Pennsylvania. University partners work with Give Back to combine resources and expertise to give students a chance at a college degree. Give Back scholars can apply to any partner school in the state they live in to receive a scholarship for tuition, room and board. Our model has utilized in-state tuition and the generosity of university partners to pre-pay for over 1000 scholarships and be on track to triple that number.

Give Back is partnered with the following colleges and universities:

Illinois
Blackburn College, Carlinville
Lewis University, Romeoville
University of St. Francis, Joliet
University of Illinois, Champaign
Northern Illinois University, DeKalb
Illinois State University, Normal

Kansas 

Kansas State University, Manhattan
Wichita State University, Wichita
Baker University, Baldwin City
Pittsburg State University, Pittsburg

New Jersey 

Montclair State University, Montclair
New Jersey Institute of Technology, Newark
Rowan University, Glassboro
Saint Peter's University, Jersey City
The College of New Jersey, Ewing
 William Paterson University, Wayne

Delaware
University of Delaware, Newark

New York
Mercy College, Dobbs Ferry
Queens College, Flushing
Binghamton University, Binghamton

Pennsylvania
 Williamson College of the Trades, Media
 West Chester University, West Chester

Sources 

Educational foundations in the United States
Charities based in Illinois